Sakrand Junction railway station 
(Sindhi: سڪرنڊ جنڪشن ريلوي اسٽيشن) is  located in Sakrand Town, District Shahid Benazirabad, Sindh,  Pakistan.

See also
 List of railway stations in Pakistan
 Pakistan Railways

References

External links

Railway stations in Shaheed Benazir Abad District